August Daniel Ehrenfried  Stöber (1808–1884) was an Alsatian poet, scholar and collector of folklore.

He was born on 9 July 1808 in Strasbourg and died on 19 March 1884 in Mulhouse, where he had worked as a teacher. 
Stöber composed poetry and tales in the Alsatian dialect, and studied the culture and history of his homeland.

Works
 Elsässisches Sagenbuch. Straßburg 1842.
 Die Lindenkirche. In: Badisches Sagen-Buch. 2. Band. Karlsruhe: Creuzbauer und Kasper, 1846, S. 140–141
 Die Sagen des Elsasses. St. Gallen 1852.

References

External links 

 

1808 births
1884 deaths
Alsatian-German people
German male writers